Padeh Boland-e Olya (also Romanized as Padeh Boland-e ‘Olyā and Pedehboland-e ‘Olyā) is a village in Javaran Rural District, Hanza District, Rabor County, Kerman Province, Iran. At the 2006 census, its population was 54 in 14 families.

References 

Populated places in Rabor County